Kancheepurathe Kalyanam is a 2009 Malayalam comedy film by the debutant pair Fazil and Jayakrishnan. The film stars  Suresh Gopi, Mukesh,and Muktha George.

Plot 
Kalarickal Achuthankutti and his brother-in-law Pattarumadom Najeeb run rival event management companies. They are not in good terms anymore after Achuthankutty's sister eloped with Najeeb. Both the parties reach Kancheepuram to organize the marriage of Meenakshi with her uncle Sreeramalingam Mudaliar's son, Saravanan. The film is about the incidents that happen there. In the end, the film ends well with Kalarickal Achuthankutty  marrying Meenakshi.

Cast

References

External links 
 

2009 films
2000s Malayalam-language films
Films scored by M. Jayachandran